X Factor Italia is a TV show which airs on prime time in Italy. The singing competition is the Italian version of Britain's The X Factor. As of Season 16, it is currently hosted by Francesca Michielin. Francesco Facchinetti hosted the show's first four seasons before being replaced by Alessandro Cattelan for Season 5 up to Season 14 before being replaced by Ludovico Tersigni for one season.
While the first four seasons were aired on Rai Due, the second channel of Italian public television service, at the moment the show is broadcast on Sky Uno, the main channel of Sky Italy.

The judges, who all belong to the Italian and international music or television world, were 3 from Season 1 to Season 3 (when the categories were: Groups, 16–24, 25+). Since Season 4, the 16-24 category was split into two parts (Boys and Girls), following the British example, therefore the judges became 4.

The programme's success is witnessed by the number of singers who became famous after the show. Among the others we can notice Giusy Ferreri from Season 1, Noemi from Season 2, Marco Mengoni from Season 3, Ruggero Pasquarelli from Season 4, Francesca Michielin from Season 5, Chiara Galiazzo, Mahmood and Le Donatella from Season 6, Michele Bravi from Season 7, Lorenzo Fragola and Madh from Season 8, Enrico Nigiotti and Måneskin from Season 11.

Series summary

  Act in Mara's Category 
  Act in Morgan's Category 
  Act in Simona's Category
  Act in Claudia's Category
  Act in Elio's Category
  Act in Enrico's Category
  Act in Arisa's Category
  Act in Mika's Category
  Act in Victoria's Category
  Act in Fedez's Category
  Act in Skin's Category
  Act in Alvaro's Category
  Act in Manuel's Category
  Act in Lodo's Category
  Act in Samuel's Category
  Act in Malika's Category
  Act in Sfera's Category
  Act in Emma's Category
  Act in Hell's Category
  Act in Ambra's Category
  Act in Dargen's Category 
  Act in Rkomi's Category

Contestants, categories and judges

Key:

 – Winning judge/category. Winners are in bold, eliminated contestants in small font.

First season (2008)
In the first edition held in the period 10 March 2008 to 27 May 2008, Morgan's contestants (Vocal Groups) were labelled "pastel green contestants", Simona's contestants (25+ years) the "pink contestants" and Mara's (16–24 years) the "pastel blue contestants"

Second season (2008-2009)
The second season was held between 25 November 2008 and 19 April 2009. The three judges were the same as the first series line-up. Simona Ventura mentored the "16-24s", Morgan the "25 and Overs" and Mara Maionchi the Groups. The winner was Matteo Becucci from the 25 and over category.

Third season (2009)
In the third edition from 16 June 2009 until 2 December 2009, the judge Simona Ventura was replaced by Claudia Mori. Morgan's contestants (16–24 years) were dubbed the "blue contestants", Claudia Mori's contestants (25+ years) the "orange" and Mara Maionchi's category of the Vocal Groups, the "red contestants".

The A&K, Mara's group, were formed by Andrea and Chiara (Kiara). However, Chiara was later disqualified from the show because of a regulation prohibiting the sons/daughters of RAI employees from entering the show, in this case, Chiara's Mother.  She was replaced by Daniele Vit.

Fourth season (2010)
From that year there are four categories with the respective judges:

 Mara Maionchi (16-24 Boys)
 Anna Tatangelo (16-24 Girls)
 Elio (25 +)
 Enrico Ruggeri (Vocal Groups)

Fifth season (2011–2012)

The fifth season of X Factor was televised from 20 October 2011 to 5 January 2012. For the first time, it was broadcast by Sky Uno HD, rather than Rai 2. The auditions were held from 5 July to 12 September 2011.

Sixth season (2012)

The sixth season of X Factor started on 20 September 2012. It is broadcast live by Sky Uno HD, and a short version recorded broadcast on free digital TV Cielo.

Seventh season (2013)

The seventh season of X Factor started on 26 September 2013. It is broadcast live by Sky Uno HD.

Eight season (2014)

The eight season of X Factor started on 18 September 2014. It is broadcast live by Sky Uno HD.

Ninth season (2015)

The ninth season of X Factor started on 10 September 2015. It is broadcast live by Sky Uno HD.

Tenth season (2016)

The tenth season of X Factor started on 22 September 2016. It was broadcast live by Sky Uno HD, and a recorded version was broadcast on free digital channel TV8.

Eleventh season (2017)

The eleventh season of X Factor started on 14 September 2017. It is broadcast live by Sky Uno HD, and a recorded version is broadcast on free digital channel TV8. The season finale, aired on 14 December 2017, marked the victory of Lorenzo Licitra against Måneskin and became the most viewed Italian X Factor live show ever.

Twelfth season (2018)

The twelfth season of X Factor started on 6 September 2018. It was broadcast live by Sky Uno HD, and a recorded version was broadcast on free digital channel TV8. The final episode of the season, aired on both Sky Uno HD and TV8, was won by Anastasio. This marked Mara Maionchi's second victory in a row.

This season also featured Asia Argento as a judge before she was fired after being accused of sexual misconduct by actor Jimmy Bennett.

Thirteenth season (2019)

The thirteenth season of X Factor started on 12 September 2019. It was broadcast live by Sky Uno HD, and a recorded version was broadcast on free digital channel TV8.

Fourteenth season (2020)

The fourteenth season of X Factor started on 17 September 2020. It was broadcast live by Sky Uno HD and a recorded version was broadcast on free digital channel TV8. The final episode of the season, aired on both Sky Uno HD and TV8, was won by Casadilego. This marked Hell Raton's first victory.

Fifteenth season (2021)

The fifteenth season of X Factor started on 16 September 2021 and concluded on 9 December with Baltimora being the winner, marking the second and final victory for Hell Raton.

Sixteenth season (2022)

The sixteenth season of X Factor started on 15 September 2022.

References

External links
 Official website

 
2008 Italian television series debuts
Italian music television series
Italian reality television series
Television series by Fremantle (company)
2000s Italian television series
2010s Italian television series
Italian television series based on British television series
RAI original programming